The Roman Catholic Diocese of Wau is a suffragan Latin rite diocese in the Ecclesiastical province of Juba which cover all and only South Sudan, yet depends on the missionary Roman Congregation for the Evangelization of Peoples.

The Cathedral episcopal see is Cathedral of St. Mary in Wau, Gharb Baḩr al Ghazāl province. The diocese is occupied since the 18 November 2020 by bishop Matthew Remijio Adam Gbitiku.

History 
 30 May 1913: Established as Apostolic Prefecture of Bahr el-Ghazal, on territory split off from the Apostolic Vicariate of Central Africa
 13 June 1917: Promoted as Apostolic Vicariate of Bahr el-Ghazal
 Lost territory repeatedly : on 1923.06.12 to establish Apostolic Prefecture of Equatorial Nile, on 1949.03.03 to establish Apostolic Prefecture of Mupoi and on 1955.07.03 to establish Apostolic Vicariate of Rumbek
 26 May 1961: Renamed after its see as Apostolic Vicariate of Wau
 12 December 1974: Promoted as Diocese of Wau

Statistics 
As per 2014, it pastorally served 2,913,120 Catholics (70.0% of 4,161,600 total) on 134,572 km² in 19 parishes with 43 priests (25 diocesan, 18 religious), 1 deacon, 56 lay religious (28 brothers, 28 sisters) and 23 seminarians.

Ordinaries 
(all Roman rite)

Apostolic Prefect of Bahr el-Ghazal
 Antonio Stoppani, Comboni Missionaries of the Heart of Jesus (M.C.C.I.) (born Italy) (1913.05.30 – 1917.06.13 see below)

Apostolic Vicars of Bahr el-Ghazal
 Antonio Stoppani, M.C.C.I. (see above 1917.06.13 – retired 1933), Titular Bishop of Stratonicea in Caria (1917.06.13 – death 1940.08.06)
 Rodolfo Orler, M.C.C.I. (born Canada) (1933.12.11 – death 1946.07.19), Titular Bishop of Prusias ad Hypium (1933.12.11 – 1946.07.19)
 Edoardo Mason, M.C.C.I. (born Italy) (1947.05.08 – 1960.05.10), Titular Bishop of Rusicade (1947.05.08 – death 1989.03.15); next Apostolic Vicar of El Obeid (Sudan) (1960.05.10 – 1969)
 Ireneus Wien Dud (first African incumbent, born Sudan) (1960.05.10 – 1961.05.26 see below), Titular Bishop of Barcusus (1955.07.03 – 1974.12.12); previously Apostolic Vicar of Rumbek (South Sudan) (1955.07.03 – 1960.05.10)

Apostolic Vicar of Wau
 Ireneus Wien Dud (see above 1961.05.26 – 1974.12.12), also President of Sudan Bishops’ Conference (1970 – 1973), Apostolic Administrator of Apostolic Vicariate of Rumbek (South Sudan) (1972 – 1974); later Metropolitan Archbishop of Juba (South Sudan) (1974.12.12 – 1982)

Suffragan Bishops of Wau 
 Gabriel Zubeir Wako (1974.12.12 – 1979.10.30), also Apostolic Administrator of Apostolic Vicariate of Rumbek (South Sudan) (1974 – 1976), President of Sudan Bishops’ Conference (1978 – 1989); later Coadjutor Archbishop of Khartoum (Sudan) (1979.10.30 – 1981.10.10), succeeding as Metropolitan Archbishop of Khartoum (1981.10.10 – retired 2016.12.10), President of Sudan Bishops’ Conference (1993 – 1999 & 2012.01.01 – 2016.10), created Cardinal-Priest of S. Atanasio a Via Tiburtina (2003.10.21 [2003.12.14] – ...)
 Joseph Bilal Nyekindi (1980.10.24 – retired 1995.11.02), died 1996
 Rudolf Deng Majak (1995.11.02 – death 2017.03.08), also President of Sudan Bishops’ Conference (2006? – 2011.12.31); previously Apostolic Administrator of Wau (1992.04.12 – succession 1995.11.02).
 Matthew Remijio Adam Gbitiku, M.C.C.I. (2020.11.18-present)

See also
 List of Catholic dioceses in Sudan and South Sudan
 Roman Catholicism in South Sudan

Sources and external links 
 GCatholic.org - data for all sections
 Diocese of Wau website

Roman Catholic dioceses in South Sudan
Religious organizations established in 1913
Roman Catholic dioceses and prelatures established in the 20th century
1913 establishments in Sudan